Nadir Hoshang Dinshaw (17 December 1925 - 12 December 2002) was a British Parsi philanthropist, businessman, and accountant notable for his unwitting role in the Thorpe affair and the honesty, generosity, and integrity with which he conducted himself.

He served on the Joint Council for the Welfare of Immigrants, the board of Christian Aid. He also founded the Nadir Dinshaw Chair in the School of Philosophy, Theology, and Religion at the University of Birmingham.

Life 
Born in December 1925, to a distinguished Parsi family in Karachi, the son of Hoshang NE Dinshaw, grandson of Nadirshaw Edulji Dinshaw and great-grandson of Seth Edulji Dinshaw.

Dinshaw was educated at Harrow School, where he attended for a year and at the University of Bombay. Dinshaw converted from Zoroastrianism to Christianity in the early 1960s.

Dinshaw died in 2002. He was married to Hilla Dubash. He was survived by his daughter Nali and his granddaughter Kitty. Rowan Williams preached at his memorial service.

Role as the 'innocent dupe' in the Thorpe Affair 

Dinshaw, was a keen supporter of the Liberal cause for many years. He has been asked by party leader, Jeremy Thorpe to act as a conduit for a £20,000 donation to avoid ‘unfortunate publicity’.

This money had been diverted by Thorpe to pay for the murder of Thorpe's alleged homosexual partner Norman Josiffe .

Before the trial, Thorpe threatened Dinshaw with deportation if he was not “economical with the truth”. Dinshaw was described by The Guardian as having ‘told the whole truth, but with such obvious concern for the friend in the dock who had so cynically tried to use him, that defense counsel George Carman congratulated him afterward’. This has been described as a rare case of a prosecution witness being commended by the defense counsel.

References

Parsi people
Pakistani philanthropists
Indian philanthropists
British philanthropists
People from Karachi
People educated at Harrow School
Converts to Christianity from Zoroastrianism
British Anglo-Catholics
British Anglicans
1925 births
2002 deaths